Karimabad is a neighbourhood in the Karachi Central district of Karachi, Pakistan. Karimabad (Gulberg Town).

Location 
It is situated at south of Gulberg Town bordering Liaquatabad, Gharibabad and Federal B. Area. The population of this Area is Majority MEMON COMMUNITY. It is also called to be a House Of THAREEK-LABAIK-PAKISTAN (TLP). Because the majority of population is Memon community and amajority of Memon Community is Sunni community and majority of Sunni loves Allama Khadim Hussain Rizvi, that is why this is called the HOUSE OF TLP (Thareek Labaik Pakistan).

Demography 
People living here belong mostly to middle class to lower middle class Memon community. Gujrati speaking Ismaili Shia are other significant community. It is also known for its whole-sale market of sports goods and stationery. The area's pivotal place are Karimabad Meat & Vegetable Market, Hussainabad Food Street, Jama Masjid  Madina,  Jama Masjid Hussainabad, Jama Masjid Noori Memon Masjid, Siddiqabad.  It is well known for its Meena Bazar and United King. There are various other markets including: Bazar-e-Faisal, Al-Najeebi and Memon Market. Karimabad is also a well known place because of its bridge. Karimabad is also adjacent to Musa Colony, famous for its fish market.

Many educational institutions like KUTIYANA MEMON ACADEMY HEF Boys School Ronaq-e-Islam Girls School and Memon Girls College situated here. Memon Medical Centre, Memon Diabetic & Diagnostic Centre and Fatimah Bai Tai Hospital are major healthcare facilities for people. 

Famous Karachi Tablighi Markaz, Madni Masjid and TLP UC-07 OFFICE  Tabba Heart Institute situated close. Haji Rehmatullah Memorial Park and Sir Adamjee Park are some of the well maintained parks of locality.

See also 
 Moosa Colony

References

External links 
 Karachi Website, Karachi Metropolitan Corporation (KMC) official website. Retrieved 6 April 2016.

Neighbourhoods of Karachi
Ismailism in Pakistan
Gulberg Town, Karachi
Retail markets in Karachi
Economy of Karachi
Karachi Central District